Geopyxis is a genus of fungi in the family Pyronemataceae. The genus has a widespread distribution. Molecular phylogenetic studies published in 2007 suggest that the genus is not monophyletic.

Species
, Index Fungorum lists 26 valid species (+1 discovered in 2016) of Geopyxis:
Geopyxis acetabularioides
Geopyxis alba
Geopyxis albocinerea
Geopyxis alpina
Geopyxis bambusicola
Geopyxis carbonaria
Geopyxis carnea
Geopyxis cavinae
Geopyxis delectans (Starback) K.Hansen & X.H.Wang, 2016
Geopyxis diluta
Geopyxis expallens
Geopyxis flavidula
Geopyxis foetida
Geopyxis granulosa
Geopyxis grossegranulosa
Geopyxis korfii
Geopyxis majalis
Geopyxis moelleriana
Geopyxis nebulosoides
Geopyxis patellaris
Geopyxis pellucida
Geopyxis pulchra
Geopyxis pusilla
Geopyxis radicans
Geopyxis rapuloides
Geopyxis rehmii
Geopyxis striatospora
Geopyxis vulcanalis

References

Pezizales genera
Pyronemataceae
Taxa named by Christiaan Hendrik Persoon